The Plantronics Colorplus is a graphics card for IBM PC computers, first sold in 1982. It is a superset of the then-current CGA standard, using the same monitor standard and providing the same pixel resolutions.  It was produced by Frederick Electronics, of Frederick, Maryland.

The Colorplus has twice the memory of a standard CGA board (32k, compared to 16k). The additional memory can be used in graphics modes to double the color depth, giving two additional graphics modes—16 colors at 320×200 resolution, or 4 colors at 640×200 resolution.

It uses the same Motorola MC6845 display controller as the previous MDA and CGA adapters.

The original card also includes a parallel printer port.

Output capabilities
CGA compatible modes:
160×100 16 color mode (actual a text mode using  , ▌, ▐ and █)
320×200 in 4 colors from a 16 color hardware palette. Pixel aspect ratio of 1:1.2.
640×200 in 2 colors. Pixel aspect ratio of 1:2.4
40×25 with 8×8 pixel font text mode (effective resolution of 320×200)
80×25 with 8×8 pixel font text mode (effective resolution of 640×200)

In addition to the CGA modes, it offers:
320×200 with 16 colors
640×200 with 4 colors
"New high-resolution" text font, selectable by hardware jumper

The "new" font was actually the unused "thin" font already present in the IBM CGA ROMs, with 1-pixel wide vertical strokes. This offered greater clarity on RGB monitors, versus the default "thick" / 2-pixel font more suitable for output to composite monitors and over RF to televisions but, contrary to Plantronics' advertising claims, was drawn at the same 8x8 pixel resolution.

Software support
Few programs made use of these modes, for which there was no BIOS support.

A 1984 advertisement listed the following software as compatible:
Color-It
UCSD P-system
Peachtree Graphics Language
Business Graphics System
Graph Power
The Draftsman
Videogram
Stock View
GSX
CompuShow (320×200 mode)

Planet X3, released by American YouTuber David "The 8-Bit Guy" Murray in 2019, was the first video game known to have Colorplus support (320×200×16). This support was added by Planet X3 enthusiast Benedikt Freisen.

Freisen also produced drivers that add Colorplus support to Sierra's adventure games that ran on the SCI0 engine.

FastDoom, a port of Doom (1993 video game) developed by Victor Nieto, added support for ColorPlus 320×200×16 mode in 2021.

Hardware clones
Some third-party CGA and EGA clones, such as the ATI Graphics Solution and the Paradise AutoSwitch EGA 480, could emulate the extra modes (usually describing them simply as 'Plantronics mode').

The Thomson TO16 (a PC-XT compatible) and the Olivetti M19 supported Plantronics modes, along with CGA.

See also
Tandy Graphics Adapter, a graphics hardware system with similar capabilities. 
Orchid Graphics Adapter
Hercules Graphics Card
Olivetti M19
Thomson TO16

References

External links
"+COLORPLUS Shatters The Mold.", an original advertisement.
A USENET posting describing the Plantronics Colorplus
The technical documentation for the Paradise EGA chipset in the Amstrad PC-1640 describes its Plantronics compatibility mode.

Computer display standards
Graphics cards
Computer-related introductions in 1982